The following table compares general and technical information for document interfaces.

See also 
 Tabbed document interface#Comparison to SDI
 Tabbed document interface#Comparison to MDI
 Multiple document interface#Comparison with single document interface

Document interface